Enrico Masseroni (20 February 1939 – 30 September 2019) was an Italian Roman Catholic archbishop. Masseroni was born in Italy and was ordained to the priesthood in 1963. He served as bishop of the Roman Catholic Diocese of Mondovi, Italy, from 1987 to 1996 and as archbishop of the Roman Catholic Archdiocese of Vercelli, Italy, from 1996 to 2014.

Notes

1939 births
2019 deaths
Italian Roman Catholic archbishops
People from Borgomanero